Robert Edward Haebel (July 18, 1927 – May 25, 2017) was a United States Marine Corps major general whose last command was Marine Corps Base Camp Pendleton. He retired in 1987 after 42 years of service. He was interred with honors at Arlington National Cemetery September 16, 2017.

Biography
Robert Haebel was born in Marcus Hook, Pennsylvania on July 18, 1927. He died on May 25, 2017, at the age of 89.

Education
He graduated from high school in 1945.  He earned a Bachelor of Science degree in Education West Chester State Teachers College  (now West Chester University of Pennsylvania) in 1951. He later earned two Master of Arts (M.A.) degrees — in Education from the University of New Mexico (1967) and in International Affairs from George Washington University (1971).

Marine Corps career
In June 1945, Haebel enlisted in the Marine Corps.  He reached the rank of sergeant prior to attending The Basic School at Marine Corps Base Quantico, Virginia, receiving his commission as a second lieutenant in June 1951.

In January 1952, he was ordered to Korea and participated in combat operations as a platoon leader with the 1st Marine Division, earning the Bronze Star with Combat "V". He was transferred to Marine Corps Base Camp Lejeune, in December 1952, and was promoted to captain in March 1954.

He served at the Marine Barracks, Treasure Island, San Francisco, California, from December 1954 to April 1957, when he was assigned to the Military Assistance Advisory Group, Taiwan, as an advisor to the Republic of China Marine Corps.

Returning to the United States, he served at Headquarters, 5th Marine Corps Recruit Reserve District, Washington, D.C., and attended the Junior Course, Amphibious Warfare School, MCB Quantico. In June 1960 he was assigned to the 3rd Marine Division, serving as a Company Commander and G-3 Operations Officer.

He returned to Camp Lejeune and served in Force Troops, Fleet Marine Force, Atlantic. In April 1962, he was promoted to major.

He served as the Marine Officer Instructor, Naval Reserve Officer Training Corps (NROTC) Unit at the University of New Mexico, from August 1964 to July 1967, when he was transferred back to the 1st Marine Division in the Republic of Vietnam and served consecutively as Operations Officer, G-3 Officer, and as a battalion commander. For his participation in combat operations in Vietnam, he was awarded the Legion of Merit with Combat "V". He was promoted to lieutenant colonel in November 1966.

Ordered to MCRD Parris Island, South Carolina, in September 1968, Haebel served as Assistant G-3 Officer, and later, as G-3 Officer of the Recruit Depot. From August 1970 to June 1971, he attended the Naval War College, Newport, Rhode Island, and upon completing the course was transferred to Hawaii as Plans Officer, G-3 Operations and Training Officer and Assistant Chief of Staff, G-3 at Headquarters, Fleet Marine Force, Pacific. He was promoted to colonel in May 1972.

In June 1975, he was ordered to the 3rd Marine Division on Okinawa and served as Commanding Officer, 4th Marine Regiment and the Camp Commander, Camp Hansen, Okinawa. He was advanced to brigadier general on April 15, 1976, and assumed duties of Commanding General, Force Troops/2nd Force Service Support Group, FMF, Atlantic, on April 23, 1976.

Ordered to Headquarters Marine Corps, General Haebel assumed duty as Director Personnel Management Division on July 28, 1978. He was promoted to major general on July 3, 1979, and assigned additional duty as Assistant Deputy Chief of Staff for Manpower in September 1979.

General Haebel assumed duty as Commanding General, Marine Corps Recruit Depot Parris Island, S.C., in July 1980. In June 1982, he was assigned duty as Commanding General, III Marine Amphibious Force/Commanding General, 3d Marine Division, FMF, Pacific on Okinawa. He served in this capacity until he became the Commanding General of Camp Pendleton on July 6, 1984.

Retirement
Major General Haebel retired from the Marine Corps on June 20, 1987, after 42 years of active duty service. On November 10, 2007, Haebel was the speaker at the 2007 Marine Corps Ball at Camp Pendleton, in honor of the Marine Corps' 232nd birthday.

Awards and decorations
Major General Haebel's decorations include:

See also

Notes

References
This article incorporates text in the public domain from the United States Marine Corps.

1927 births
2017 deaths
United States Marine Corps personnel of the Korean War
United States Marine Corps personnel of the Vietnam War
United States Marines
United States Marine Corps generals
University of New Mexico alumni
University of New Mexico faculty
Recipients of the Navy Distinguished Service Medal
Recipients of the Legion of Merit
People from Marcus Hook, Pennsylvania
Burials at Arlington National Cemetery
Military personnel from Pennsylvania